The 1871 Norwich by-election was fought on 22 February 1871.  The byelection was fought due to the void election of the incumbent MP of the Liberal Party, Jacob Henry Tillett.  It was won by the Liberal candidate Jeremiah James Colman.

References

Elections in Norwich
By-elections to the Parliament of the United Kingdom in Norfolk constituencies
1871 elections in the United Kingdom
1871 in England
19th century in Norfolk